51 Degrees North (sometimes stylized as 51° North) is a 2014 science fiction film written and directed by Grigorij Richters and starring Moritz von Zeddelmann, Steve Nallon, Jamie Doyle, Dolly-Ann Osterloh and Steven Cree. The film is visually presented as found footage shot from the perspective of various video recording devices, primarily from a hand-held camcorder operated by the main characters and from CCTV cameras and Social Media. The original soundtrack was composed by Queen and Brian May.

Plot
Damon Miller (Moritz von Zeddelmann) is a talented, young German filmmaker, living in London, grappling with the pressures of an impoverished profession and a dissolving relationship, who stumbles into the discovery that the Earth stands on the brink of an extraterrestrial disaster.

They inform Damon that the world will end in less than three weeks when a series of asteroids will strike the Earth. However, a glimmer of hope remains in the form of a secret spaceship orbiting the Earth that can house up to 2,000 people. In exchange for a ticket to this spaceship, they task Damon with documenting the final moments leading up to the asteroid strike.

Seeing an opportunity to save Ann and his unborn child, a chance to mend the rift his obsession has created, Damon accepts the assignment. As the end of days arrives, Damon watches London descend into madness, with families torn apart and friends lost. Armed only with his camera, Damon prepares to make the ultimate sacrifice to save the ones he loves.

Cast
 Moritz von Zeddelmann as Damon Miller
 Steven Cree as Michael Burlington
 Steve Nallon as Professor Richards
 Jamie Doyle as Frank
 Dolly-Ann Osterloh as Ann
 Frenzi as Frenzi
 Snoopy as Snoopy

Production
51° North was shot between 2011 and 2014 in and around London, initially using a skeleton crew and employing guerrilla filmmaking tactics. The crew included stunt coordinator Greg Powell whose previous credits include the James Bond, Harry Potter, and Jason Bourne franchises.

The film was one of the largest productions ever to shoot at Piccadilly Circus, featuring over 2,500 extras.

Music

Brian May, guitarist of British rock band Queen composed the music for the film.

Release
51° North headlined the 2014 Starmus Festival and will be released on 30 June 2015.

See also
 List of films featuring space stations

References

External links

 

2014 films
British science fiction thriller films
2010s science fiction thriller films
2010s English-language films
2010s British films